The Best American Nonrequired Reading 2008, a volume in The Best American Nonrequired Reading series, was edited by Dave Eggers and introduced by Judy Blume.  The works anthologized are selected by high school students in California and Michigan through 826 Valencia and 826michigan.

Works included

Notes

External links
 The Best American Nonrequired Reading  

2008 anthologies
Fiction anthologies
Nonrequired Reading 2008
Houghton Mifflin books